Royal Park Hotel is a hotel in Hong Kong.

Royal Park Hotel may also refer to:
Royal Park Hotel, Toxteth,  a hotel in Toxteth, Liverpool, England, UK
Royal Park Hotel Rochester Detroit, a hotel in the Detroit suburb of Rochester, Michigan, U.S.

zh:帝都酒店